Blastobasis atmosema is a moth in the  family Blastobasidae. It was described by Edward Meyrick in 1930. It is found in Brazil (Para).

References

Natural History Museum Lepidoptera generic names catalog

Blastobasis
Moths described in 1930
Gelechioidea of South America
Taxa named by Edward Meyrick